Ioannis Papadiamantopoulos (1839–1909) was a Greek soldier who rose to the rank of major general, and served as head of the military household of King George I of Greece and briefly Minister of Military Affairs.

Life
Ioannis Papadiamantopoulos was born in Patras on 6 November 1839, as the son of major general Dimitrios Papadiamantopoulos. He entered the Hellenic Army Academy, and graduated in 1862 as a second lieutenant of the engineers. 

In 1885–1895, he taught military law at the Army Academy, before being appointed Minister of Military Affairs in the 1895 caretaker cabinet of Nikolaos Diligiannis. He was then made aide-de-camp and head of the military household of King George I of Greece, and then served as the King's privy councillor until his retirement on 1 June 1909. He died at athens on 27 November of the same year.

References 

1839 births
1909 deaths
Hellenic Army major generals
People from Patras
History of Greece (1863–1909)
Ministers of Military Affairs of Greece